"Live My Life" is a song by American group Far East Movement from their fourth studio album Dirty Bass. The song was released on February 25, 2012 as the album's lead single. It features vocals from Canadian singer Justin Bieber. The song was produced by RedOne and De Paris.

The official remix of the song, subtitled "Live My Life (Party Rock Remix)", features vocals from Redfoo of LMFAO. The track was released on March 6, 2012 as a digital download. Also, it was included as the last track of the standard edition of Dirty Bass.

Music video
A music video to accompany the release of "Live My Life" was first released onto YouTube on April 5, 2012 through Far East Movement's Vevo channel at a total length of 4 minutes and 43 seconds. Justin Bieber did not appear in the video, but Redfoo and the Party Rock crew does. They are seen throughout the video touring and dancing through the streets of Amsterdam in the Party Rock bus, was filmed in the Netherlands. They also perform a synchronized dance routine in a flash mob-style. Far East Movement perform their respective verses. Dutch singer Eva Simons cameos in the video, seen entering the party bus midway through the video, as well as Dutch DJs Sidney Samson, Sick Individuals and Quintino. The music video has over 66 million views.

An alternate video edit was made for the Party Rock Remix at a total length of 4 minutes and 38 seconds. It features the same scenes from the original and includes Redfoo performing his verse. This version has over 25 million views.

The videos were written by Redfoo and Kelly Covell and directed by Mickey Finnegan (who has previously directed music videos for LMFAO's songs such as "Party Rock Anthem" and "Sexy and I Know It" among others) while production was handled by Cisco Newman and Alexa Dedlow.

The video makes a reference to John Cusack's character from the film Say Anything...; it begins with Kev Nish holding up a boombox while standing outside of a female lead's apartment window, and ends with him taking her home.

Track listing

Credits and personnel
 Vocals – Far East Movement and Justin Bieber
 Lyrics – Bilal "The Chef" Hajji, Kevin Michael Nishimura, James Hwan Roh, Jae Won Choung, Virman Pau Coquia, Nathan Lawrence Walker, Justin Bieber
 Musician – Nadir "RedOne" Khayat, Jonathan Maman, Jean Claude Sindress, Yohanne Simon (De Paris)
 Producer, instrumentation, programming – RedOne and Yohanne Simon (De Paris)
 Recording – Trevor Muzzy, Jeremy "J" Stevenson, Jaime "Jimmy Cash" Lepe and Kyle Kashiwagi
 Vocal producer (Justin Bieber's vocals) – Kuk Harrell
 Vocal recording and editing (Justin Bieber's vocals) – Josh Gudwin, Chris "TEK" O'Ryan
 Remixer, additional vocals (Party Rock Remix) – Stefan Kendal "Redfoo" Gordy
 Additional keyboards (Party Rock Remix) – Martin "Cherry Cherry Boom Boom" Kierszenbaum
 Mixing – Robert Orton
 Mastering – Gene Grimaldi
 Label: Cherrytree Records / Interscope Records

Charts and certifications

Weekly charts

Year-end charts

Certifications

Release history

References

2012 singles
2012 songs
Far East Movement songs
Justin Bieber songs
Interscope Records singles
Song recordings produced by RedOne
Songs written by RedOne
Songs written by John Mamann
Songs written by Jean-Claude Sindres
Songs written by Yohanne Simon
Songs written by Bilal Hajji